Yuri Yakovlevich Lavrushkin (sometimes Romanized Lavyrushkin; born 4 November 1948) is a retired Russian road cyclist.

Early life
Born near the Urals in the city of Orsk, Lavrushkin attended the Moscow Institute of Physical Culture.

Career
Lavrushkin won the 1972 Tour of Yugoslavia.

He won the Rás Tailteann in 1977.

References

1948 births
Living people
Russian male cyclists
Soviet male cyclists
Rás Tailteann winners
People from Orsk
Sportspeople from Orenburg Oblast